Liga Indonesia Third Division (Indonesian: Divisi Tiga Liga Indonesia) is the lowest level (5th) of nationwide football competition in Indonesia. Along with first and second division, this league is managed by the Amateur League Board of the Football Association of Indonesia (PSSI).

This is the final league in Indonesia and there is no relegation, that a team can go all the way and become champion. This competition involves players under the age of twenty years, as part of the youth player development program.

After the establishment of the Liga Nusantara in 2014, the Third Division will be dissolved.

Another  Explanation
Division  Three Liga Indonesia is the lowest division in the Liga Indonesia. Status of the club and the players who play in this division are amateurs. In  the 2008 competition, regulation Division 3 players are restricted to the age group 21 years and allowed only three players over the age wear-free. There is no degradation in Division III competition,  but there are some top ranked  teams will be promoted to Division II.

Division Three began to be held in 2005, the first season winner is PSIR Apex. The game begins with a Division Three match the provincial level to compete for quota compete in the National Zone Act. Ration is different in each province depending on the number three team division in the province.

Having escaped from the provincial level, teams that qualify will face teams from other provinces within the same zone (island). Usually divided into Zones 1 & 2 of Sumatra, Java 1 & 2, Kalimantan, Sulawesi 1 & 2, Nusa Tenggara, Papua & Maluku. After the round, the teams that qualify will face teams from other zones in the national round.

Previous winners

2005-2008 (fourth-tier)
2005 - PSIR (Rembang)
2006 - Perseta (Tulungagung)
2007 - Persem (Mojokerto)

2008-2013 (fifth-tier)
2008 - Persikotas (Tasikmalaya)
2009/2010 - Persewar (Waropen)
2010/2011 - MBU Sidoarjo (Sidoarjo)
2012 - Persiga Trenggalek (Trenggalek Regency) (LPIS) and Jember United (BLAI)
2013/2014 - Perseba Bangkalan (Bangkalan Regency)

References

External links
Website of the PSSI's Board for Amateur Leagues
Official website

 
5
5
Sports leagues established in 2005